Martin Benkenstein (born 30 June 1950 in Johannesburg, South Africa), is a former South African cricketer.  A right-hand batsman, he represented both Natal and Rhodesia.

His youngest son Dale has played cricket for Natal, Durham, and South Africa, and his other two sons Brett and Boyd have also represented Natal at various times.

References

1950 births
Living people
White South African people
South African cricketers
Rhodesia cricketers
KwaZulu-Natal cricketers